Quercus blakei is an uncommon species of tree in the beech family Fagaceae. It has been found in Indochina (Laos and Vietnam) and southern China (Guangdong, Guangxi, Guizhou, Hainan ). It is placed in subgenus Cerris, section Cyclobalanopsis.

Description
Quercus blakei is a tree up to 35 m. tall, with leaves as much as 190 mm long.
The acorns are ellipsoid to ovoid, 25-35 × 15–30 mm with a flat to depressed scar 7–11 mm in diameter.  The cupules are shallow-bowl-shaped, 5-10 × 20–30 mm, covering base of acorn, with bracts in 6 or 7 rings, margin entire or dentate. 
In China, flowering occurs in March and acorns ca be found from October–December.

References

External links
Line drawings, Flora of China Illustrations vol. 4, fig. 386, drawings 5-11 and lower left and upper left

blakei
Flora of China
Flora of Indo-China
Trees of Vietnam
Plants described in 1900